Alma del Banco (24 December 1862 – 8 March 1943) was a German modernist painter.

Life

Banco was born in Hamburg in 1862 to a Jewish family. She initially worked as a craftsperson before taking to painting at the age of 30. She trained at the Hamburg school run by Valeska Röver, Ernst Eitner and Arthur Illies. She travelled with Eitner and before the first World War she studied in Paris with André Lhote and Fernand Léger.

She was an influential figure in Hamburg and in 1919 she co-founded the arts group Hamburgische Sezession. During the 1920s her work developed in the Cubist style and she travelled with another Jewish German artist Gretchen Wohlwill.

Thirteen of her paintings were judged to be "degenerate" in 1937 by the Nazi regime and were confiscated.

Banco committed suicide Hamburg on 8 March 1943 by morphine knowing that she was facing transportation by the Nazi regime.

References

1862 births
1943 suicides
Artists from Hamburg
German women painters
Drug-related suicides in Germany